WTOG (channel 44) is a television station licensed to St. Petersburg, Florida, United States, serving as the CW affiliate for the Tampa Bay area. It is owned by the CBS News and Stations group, and maintains studios on Northeast 105th Terrace in St. Petersburg, near the west end of the Gandy Bridge; its transmitter is located in Riverview, Florida.

History

Early years
WTOG first signed on the air on November 4, 1968, operating as an independent station. The station was founded by Saint Paul, Minnesota-based Hubbard Broadcasting, who also owned radio station WGTO (540 AM, now WFLF) in nearby Cypress Gardens; Hubbard originally wanted to name the station WGTO-TV, but the request was denied by the Federal Communications Commission (FCC); in those days, the FCC did not allow television and radio stations to share the same base callsign if they were licensed in different cities. This led to Hubbard using a slightly modified form of the callsign.

The station began with a limited test schedule airing two hours per day, but expanded to broadcasting eight hours per day on January 27, 1969, initially airing from 3 p.m. to 11 p.m. daily.

Initially, WTOG ran a lineup of older movies, some low-budget syndicated programs, a few off-network westerns and sitcoms, and some cartoons. In the station's early days, its slogan was "WTOG... As Far as the Eye Can See", which was made famous by its mid-1970s station identification package. WTOG caught on with viewers immediately; so much so, in fact, that it forced competitor WSUN-TV (channel 38, frequency now occupied by WTTA) off the air in 1970. For the rest of the 1970s into the early 1980s, WTOG was the only independent station in the Tampa Bay area. During the 1970s, WTOG gradually expanded its programming hours: by 1972, the station signed on at 10:30 a.m. on weekdays and around 1 p.m. on weekends. By 1976, WTOG signed on the air daily by 7 a.m. Gradually, WTOG added better sitcoms, more cartoons, off-network dramas, and better movies. While the station was profitable all along, its programming improved significantly in the late 1970s.

Becoming a superstation
Channel 44 finally gained competition in 1981, when Family Group Broadcasting signed on WFTS-TV (channel 28) as a family-oriented independent station. However, WTOG remained the clear leader in the market for the next two decades. During the 1970s and 1980s, the station was carried on many cable providers in central and southwestern Florida. In the 1980s, WTOG also maintained a network of low-powered repeaters, located in Sebring, Inverness, Arcadia (in the Fort Myers market; that translator has since shut down), Ocala (part of the Orlando market; that translator, W29AB, has since become a translator for Orlando's WKMG-TV) and Okeechobee (part of the West Palm Beach market). It billed itself as "Florida's Super Station", which "Covered Florida Like The Sun".

There was also some consideration to put WTOG on cable in Tallahassee, but that never came to fruition. WTOG was one of the most profitable independent stations in the country. In fact, during the late 1970s, Ted Turner called the station to ask how WTOG made itself so profitable.

From Fox to UPN
On October 9, 1986, WTOG became a charter affiliate of the fledgling Fox network. The station, however, was still effectively programmed as an independent during its time as a Fox affiliate as the network's programming only comprised two hours of its prime time lineup on Saturday and Sunday evenings early on (they would not expand their programming to seven days a week until 1993). However, over time, channel 44 became one of several Fox affiliates nationwide that were disappointed with the network's weak programming offerings, particularly on Saturday nights, which were bogging down WTOG's otherwise successful lineup. WTOG dropped its Fox affiliation on August 8, 1988, sending it to WFTS (which was acquired by the E. W. Scripps Company in 1986). Through the early 1990s, WTOG was still running mostly cartoons (both classic and recent), classic and recent sitcoms, drama series and older movies. As part of deal with United Television, WTOG was an affiliate of the Prime Time Entertainment Network syndication programming service from 1993 to 1995.

WTOG was largely unaffected by the affiliation swaps of 1994, which saw longtime CBS affiliate WTVT (channel 13) switch to Fox (as a result of the network's affiliation deal with then-owners, New World Communications); WFTS becoming an ABC affiliate; and longtime ABC outlet WTSP (channel 10) assuming the market's CBS affiliation. However, channel 44 did regain a network relationship when it became a charter affiliate of the United Paramount Network (UPN) at its launch on January 16, 1995. As with its days as a Fox affiliate, WTOG continued to program itself as an independent, programming a traditional general entertainment format during the day, with UPN programming being shown during the prime time hours.

Paramount Stations Group, a subsidiary of Viacom (which jointly owned the All News Channel cable network with Hubbard) purchased the station in the spring of 1996; at the time, Paramount Stations Group was in the process of selling stations it owned that were not UPN owned-and-operated stations, and traded NBC affiliates WNYT in Albany, New York and WHEC-TV in Rochester, New York to Hubbard. The purchase by Viacom made WTOG a UPN owned-and-operated station, becoming the first network-owned station in the Tampa Bay market. Soon after taking control, Paramount changed WTOG's on-air branding to "UPN44", which remained in use for the remainder of the network's run. By the late 1990s, older sitcoms (such as All in the Family) and older cartoons made way for talk shows, court shows and reality programs (such as People's Court and Judge Mills Lane) during the daytime. Recent cartoons (such as Pokémon, Sailor Moon, Garfield and Friends and Disney's Hercules) and recent sitcoms (such as Charles in Charge, Step by Step, Family Matters, Sister, Sister, Roseanne, The Simpsons, Seinfeld (now on WTTA) and Friends) continued to air but movies also were eliminated almost completely. Viacom purchased CBS in 2000 and merged that network's owned-and-operated stations into Paramount Stations Group.

For one day in May 1999, WTOG housed the operations for WFLA-TV (channel 8), after a power outage occurred at that station's main studios in Downtown Tampa.

Switch to The CW
On January 24, 2006, CBS Corporation (which split from Viacom, one month earlier) and the Warner Bros. Entertainment unit of Time Warner announced that the two companies would shut down The WB and UPN and combine the networks' respective programming to create a new "fifth" network called The CW. The CW signed a 10-year affiliation agreement with 11 of CBS' UPN stations, including WTOG; channel 44 became a CW owned-and-operated station when the network launched on September 18, 2006. Under current ownership, WTOG is one of two network-owned stations in the Tampa Bay market, alongside Fox-owned WTVT. Gradually, cartoons would disappear from WTOG's schedule, as with every broadcast station in the early 2000s. More reality and court shows would begin airing in place of that programming, while sitcoms continue to run during the evening hours.

For years, WTOG had handled master control operations for its sister station, KEYE-TV in Austin, Texas. However, in November 2006, WTOG's master control facilities, along with that of Atlanta's WUPA, were moved to sister CW affiliate WGNT in Norfolk, Virginia; 20 WTOG employees were laid off, even though CBS had previously denied that such terminations would happen. KEYE was later sold to Cerberus Capital Management, through its Four Points Media Group (which in turn was sold to the Sinclair Broadcast Group, then-owner of MyNetworkTV affiliate WTTA). WGNT was sold to Local TV, the owner of that market's CBS affiliate WTKR, in August 2010 (Local TV was merged with Tribune Broadcasting three years later, in August 2013; both WGNT and WTKR are now sister stations of WFTS under Scripps ownership). When CBS wound down operations at the Norfolk hub, WTOG and WUPA began handling their own master control operations once again.

Programming
Syndicated programming seen on WTOG includes Hot Bench, Divorce Court, Two and a Half Men, Mike & Molly, and 2 Broke Girls, among others. WTOG formerly produced a Saturday afternoon horror movie showcase, Creature Feature, which ran on the station from 1971 to 1995.

Sports programming
From its sign-on through 1976, WTOG carried Atlanta Braves baseball games through a syndication package that aired regionally on stations across the Southern United States before the cable/satellite launch of Superstation TBS the same year effectively ended the Braves regional network. From 1977 until 1989, it aired a variety of Major League Baseball games from various team networks on a daily basis (with the exception of Saturdays, Mondays and Wednesdays). These included games from the Boston Red Sox, Chicago White Sox, Cincinnati Reds, Detroit Tigers, Houston Astros, Kansas City Royals, Minnesota Twins, New York Yankees, Philadelphia Phillies, Pittsburgh Pirates, St. Louis Cardinals and the Toronto Blue Jays, as those teams were mainly in the Grapefruit League for spring training in the Tampa Bay, Orlando, Fort Myers and Sarasota areas. WTOG discontinued the baseball broadcasts when ESPN became the cable partner for Major League Baseball in 1990.

WTOG aired numerous Tampa Bay Rowdies professional NASL soccer road games in the late 1970s and early 1980s. Additionally, many home and away indoor matches were shown.

The station also aired NHL games televised by NBC that were preempted by WFLA-TV in the 1970s. It later aired games from the NHL Network syndication package in the late 1970s and early 1980s. From 1992 until 2003, the station was the flagship of the Tampa Bay Lightning television network; the Lightning has been cable-exclusive since the 2003–04 season.

News operation
From its sign-on through 1982, WTOG ran daily news capsules, mainly at sign-on and sign-off, with an announcer reading the day's headlines over a slide. In the late 1970s and early 1980s, the station featured an on-camera newsreader providing a news summary during its morning discussion program, Florida Daybreak. WTOG started using the Eyewitness News brand in the late 1970s, though its news was still a rather staid, low-key affair.

In 1982, Hubbard Broadcasting established a full-fledged news department for WTOG, and debuted a nightly 10 p.m. newscast. At first, WTOG continued to use the Eyewitness News name, with Barbara Callahan (former co-host of WTOG's edition of PM Magazine) and John Nicholson (formerly an anchor at WTVT) as co-anchors. During the mid-1980s, the station's newscast was renamed Tampa Bay Tonight, subsequently changing in 1988 to 44 News at Ten and then WTOG 44 News at Ten in 1992. Between 1985 and 1995, John Summer served as primary anchor with various co-anchors, including Callahan. In 1996, following Viacom's acquisition of WTOG, the 10 p.m. broadcast was retitled as the UPN44 10 O'Clock News, co-anchored by Callahan and Patrick Emory. WTOG also had a 11 a.m. newscast from 1995 to 1996.

WTOG's news department was shut down in 1998, as a result of cost-cutting measures mandated by then-parent company Viacom and competition from Fox station WTVT's own 10 p.m. newscast. From that point until 2020, WTOG did not air any newscasts, which made it one of seven CBS-owned stations that did not air any local news programming (the other six were KSTW in Seattle and WUPA in Atlanta—both of which last aired outsourced newscasts in 2005, KTXA in Dallas–Fort Worth and WBFS-TV in Miami—both of which canceled newscasts produced by a sister station in 2011, though KTXA retains a sports show, and the Detroit duopoly of WWJ-TV and WKBD-TV—which canceled their morning newscast in 2012, although, WWJ-TV still airs weather updates; WUPA and WKBD has since begun airing newscasts produced by sister stations in other markets). WTOG had aired the syndicated morning show The Daily Buzz from 2004 until its sudden cancellation in 2015. It replaced its former time slot with paid programming and children's shows.

On January 17, 2020, CBS Television Stations announced that they will be introducing nightly 10 p.m. newscasts for WTOG, which debuted on March 9; the newscast for WTOG is produced by CBS' Miami sister station WFOR-TV. It also marked WTOG's return to airing local news programming since its own in-house news department shut down 22 years earlier. This newscast was converted to the CBS News Now format (as Tampa Bay Now News) upon its launch in July 2022.

Notable former on-air staff
 Jane Akre – anchor (1996)
 Dick Bennick – host of Creature Feature as "Dr. Paul Bearer" (1973–1995)
 Christine Chubbuck – reporter (early 1970s)
 Ray Perkins – host of The Buc Report
 Beasley Reece – sports (1986–1988, 1997–1998; later of KYW-TV in Philadelphia)
 Carmen Roberts – reporter (1980s)
 Mary Rogers – anchor (−1993)
 Rob Stone – sports (late 1990s); later with ESPN, now at Fox Sports
 Ken Suarez – reporter (1988–1998, now at WTVT)

Technical information

Subchannels
The station's digital signal is multiplexed:

Analog-to-digital conversion
WTOG shut down its analog signal, over UHF channel 44, on June 12, 2009, as part of the federally mandated transition from analog to digital television. The station's digital signal relocated from its pre-transition UHF channel 59, which was among the high band UHF channels (52–69) that were removed from broadcasting use as a result of the transition, to its analog-era frequency, UHF channel 44.

Translators

Former translator
WTOG previously operated a third translator, W29AB (channel 29) licensed to Ocala. In 1995, it was sold to First Media and became a translator for WCPX (now WKMG-TV) in Orlando.

References

External links

TOG
Mass media in St. Petersburg, Florida
CBS News and Stations
The CW affiliates
Start TV affiliates
Dabl affiliates
This TV affiliates
Television channels and stations established in 1968
1968 establishments in Florida
National Hockey League over-the-air television broadcasters
Superstations in the United States